J K S College, Jamshedpur, established in 1979, is a general degree college in the Jharkhand state of India. It offers undergraduate and postgraduate courses in arts, commerce and sciences.

See also
Education in India
Literacy in India
List of institutions of higher education in Jharkhand

References

External links
https://www.jkscollege.ac.in/

Colleges affiliated to Kolhan University
Educational institutions established in 1979
Universities and colleges in Jharkhand
Education in Jamshedpur